This is a list of ministers of the environment or officials in cabinet level positions with "environment" in their titles.

Afghanistan

Åland Islands

Albania

Algeria

Andorra

Angola

Antigua and Barbuda

Argentina

Armenia

Aruba

Australia

Austria

Azerbaijan

Bahamas

Bahrain

Bangladesh

Barbados

Belarus

Belgium

Belize

Benin

Bermuda

Bhutan

Bolivia

Bosnia and Herzegovina

Botswana

Brazil

Brunei

Bulgaria

Burkina Faso

Burma 
See Myanmar.

Burundi

Cambodia

Cameroon

Canada

Cape Verde

Cayman Islands

Central African Republic

Chad

Chile

Republic of the Congo

Cook Islands

Costa Rica

Ivory Coast

Croatia

Cuba

Cyprus

Czech Republic

Denmark

Djibouti

Dominica

Dominican Republic

East Timor 
See Timor-Leste

Ecuador

Egypt

El Salvador

Equatorial Guinea

Eritrea

Estonia

Ethiopia

European Union

Faroe Islands

Fiji

Finland

France

Gabon

The Gambia

Georgia

Germany

Ghana

Greece

Greenland

Grenada

Guatemala

Guinea

Guinea-Bissau

Guyana

Haiti

Holy See

Honduras

Hong Kong

Hungary

Iceland

India

Indonesia

Iran

Iraq

Republic of Ireland

Israel

Italy

Jamaica

Japan

Jordan

Kazakhstan

Kenya

Kiribati

Kuwait

Kyrgyzstan

Laos

Latvia

Lebanon

Lesotho

Liberia

Libya

Liechtenstein

Lithuania

Luxembourg

Madagascar

Malawi

Malaysia

Maldives

Mali

Malta

Marshall Islands

Mauritania

Mauritius

Mexico

Federated States of Micronesia

Moldova

Monaco

Mongolia

Montenegro 
See Serbia and Montenegro

Morocco

Mozambique

Myanmar

Namibia

Nauru

Nepal

Netherlands

Netherlands Antilles

New Zealand

Nicaragua

Niger

Nigeria

North Korea

North Macedonia

Norway

Oman

Pakistan

Palau

Palestine

Panama

Papua New Guinea

Paraguay

Peru

Philippines

Poland

Portugal

Qatar

Romania

Russia

Rwanda

Sahrawi Arab Democratic Republic

Saint Kitts and Nevis

Saint Lucia

Saint Vincent and the Grenadines

Samoa

San Marino

São Tomé and Príncipe

Saudi Arabia

Scotland

Senegal

Serbia 
See also #Serbia and Montenegro

Serbia and Montenegro

Seychelles

Sierra Leone

Singapore

Slovakia

Slovenia

Solomon Islands

Somalia
(Buri Mohamed Hamza)        State Minister Of Environment 2015

South Africa

South Korea

Spain

Sri Lanka

Sudan

Suriname

Swaziland

Sweden

Switzerland

Syria

Republic of China (Taiwan)

Tajikistan

Tanzania

Thailand

Timor-Leste

Togo

Tonga

Trinidad and Tobago

Tunisia

Turkey

Turkmenistan

Tuvalu

Uganda

Ukraine 

Dr. Thani bin Ahmed Al Zeyoudi - Minister of Climate Change and Environment

United Kingdom

United States
See United States Secretary of the Interior#List of secretaries of the interior.

Uruguay

Uzbekistan

Vatican 
See Holy See

Vanuatu

Venezuela

Vietnam

Wales

Yemen

South Yemen

Zambia

Zimbabwe

See also 

 List of environmental ministries
 List of ministers of climate change
 List of ministries of forestry

References

Notes

Bibliography 
 
 
 
 

Environment